Elaman Creek is a rural locality in the Sunshine Coast Region, Queensland, Australia. In the  Elaman Creek had a population of 68 people.

History 
Elaman Creek State School opened about 1940 and closed about 1960.

In the  Elaman Creek had a population of 68 people.

References 

Suburbs of the Sunshine Coast Region
Localities in Queensland